This is a discography of the Requiem by Wolfgang Amadeus Mozart.

In the following table, ensembles playing on period instruments in historically informed performance are marked by a green background under the header Instr..

Other recordings 
 Ralf Otto,  (Levin completion), L'arpa festante München, Julia Kleiter, Gerhild Romberger, Daniel Sans, Klaus Mertens, NCA
 Christoph Spering, Chorus Musicus, Das Neue Orchester, Iride Martinez, Monica Groop, Steve Davislim, Kwangchul Youn, Opus 111 (2002)
 Nikolaus Harnoncourt, Arnold Schoenberg Chor, Concentus Musicus Wien, Christine Schäfer, Bernarda Fink, Kurt Streit, Gerald Finley, Deutsche Harmonia Mundi
 Carl Czerny transcription for soli, coro and piano four hands: Antonio Greco, Coro Costanzo Porta, Diego Maccagnola, Anna Bessi, Silvia Frigato, Raffaele Giordani, Riccardo Demini. Discantica (2012)
 John Butt conducting the Dunedin Consort on the Linn Records label. The first recording to use David Black's new critical edition of the Süssmayr version, it attempts to reconstruct the performing forces at the first performances in Vienna in 1791 and 1793. It won the 2014 Gramophone Award for Best Choral Recording.
 Zdeněk Košler conducting the Slovak Philharmonic Orchestra and Chorus, with Magdaléna Hajóssyová, Jaroslava Horská, Jozef Kundlák and Peter Mikuláš, Naxos, 1989: recorded at the Reduta, Bratislava, March 1985.

Notes and references

Discographies of classical compositions
Compositions by Wolfgang Amadeus Mozart
Discography